Miss Christina is a 1992, Romanian horror thriller film directed by , starring Adrian Pintea, Mariana Buruiană, and . It tells the story of the attraction between a young man and the ghost of a young woman. The film is based on the 1936 novella Miss Christina by Mircea Eliade.

Cast
 Adrian Pintea as Paschievici
  as Nazarie
 Irina Petrescu as Mrs. Moscu
  as Cristina
 George Constantin as The Doctor
 Raluca Penu as Sanda
 Medeea Marinescu as Simina

See also
 Miss Christina (2013 film), a later adaptation of the same novella.

References

External links
 

1992 drama films
1992 films
Films based on Romanian novels
Films based on works by Mircea Eliade
Haunted house films
Romanian horror thriller films
1990s Romanian-language films